Mesoleptus is a genus of parasitic wasp in the family Ichneumonidae with a wide geographic distribution.

The antennae of its members are typically long, slender, and usually curved. The head is short and narrow with oval, slightly protruding eyes. The thorax is somewhat humped, with small wings. The cellules of the wings, which are small enclosed areas between veins, are either very small or entirely absent. It is characterized by the narrowed abdomen referred to as a petiole. Abdomen shape is usually oblong and smooth. The legs are slender and long, although the hindmost leg can be thickened.

In 2008, Dr. Chris Williams at the National University of Ireland, Galway announced the discovery of what he believed to be a new species of Mesoleptus, for which he suggested the name Mesoleptus hibernica (for the ancient Latin name for Ireland) in an interview. However, the species has yet to be confirmed or published, and is therefore not a valid species name.

Selected species 
 Mesoleptus borealis (Davis, 1898)
 Mesoleptus congener (Förster, 1876)
 Mesoleptus davisii (Dalla Torre, 1898)
 Mesoleptus declivus (Provancher, 1886)
 Mesoleptus devotus (Förster, 1876)
 Mesoleptus distinctus (Förster, 1876)
 Mesoleptus glaucus (Davis, 1898)
 Mesoleptus hispanicus Jussila et al. 2010
 Mesoleptus ignotus (Cresson, 1868)
 Mesoleptus incessor (Haliday)
 Mesoleptus ithacae (Ashmead, 1896)
 Mesoleptus laevigatus (Gravenhorst, 1837)
 Mesoleptus laticinctus (Walker, 1874)
 Mesoleptus pronus (Förster, 1876)
 Mesoleptus sawoniewiczi Jussila et al. 2010
 Mesoleptus solitarius (Förster, 1876)
 Mesoleptus tobiasi Jonaitis
 Mesoleptus tunisiensis Jussila et al. 2010
 Mesoleptus vigilatorius (Förster, 1876)

References 

Ichneumonidae genera